Hüyükköy is a village in the Orta District of Çankırı Province in Turkey. Its population is 110 (2021).

References

Villages in Orta District